Pseudoliomera is a genus of crabs in the family Xanthidae, containing the following species:

 Pseudoliomera granosimana (A. Milne-Edwards, 1865)
 Pseudoliomera helleri (A. Milne-Edwards, 1865)
 Pseudoliomera lata (Borradaile, 1902)
 Pseudoliomera neospeciosa (Deb, 1989)
 Pseudoliomera paraspeciosa (Ward, 1941)
 Pseudoliomera remota (Rathbun, 1907)
 Pseudoliomera ruppellioides (Odhner, 1925)
 Pseudoliomera speciosa (Dana, 1852)
 Pseudoliomera variolosa (Borradaile, 1902)
 Pseudoliomera violacea (A. Milne-Edwards, 1873)

References

Xanthoidea